The 2015 ADAC Formula 4 season was the inaugural season of the ADAC Formula 4, which replaced the ADAC Formel Masters. It began on 25 April at Oschersleben and finished on 4 October at Hockenheim after eight triple header rounds. 
Champion Marvin Dienst took 8 wins, as runner-up Sweden Joel Eriksson won 7 races. Joey Mawson won five races while Mick Schumacher, Lando Norris, Ralf Aron and David Beckmann won one race each.

Teams and drivers

Race calendar
The calendar was published on 12 December 2014. All rounds, except for the second Oschersleben round supporting DTM, were part of ADAC GT Masters weekends.

Race results

Championship standings

Points were awarded to the top 10 classified finishers in each race. No points were awarded for pole position or fastest lap.

Drivers' Championship

Rookies' Championship

Footnotes

References

External links
 

ADAC Formula 4 seasons
ADAC
ADAC Formula 4
ADAC F4